The Glasmine 43 was an anti-personnel mine with a glass body used by the Nazi Germany during World War II.

This mine was an early form of minimum metal mine, designed with the minimum amount of metal to reduce the likelihood of detection by the Polish mine detector then in use by Allied forces. The reduced use of metal was also beneficial because it saved this valuable war resource for other uses.

Description

The mine consists of a glass bowl,  in diameter containing an explosive charge and a detonator. Each mine was supplied with a small quantity of cement putty to seal gaps between the main body and the glass disk cover and make the mine waterproof.

When stepped on, the pressure plate shattered the glass disk and activated the detonator, detonating the mine's main explosive charge. Two types of detonator were used. Early versions of the mine used a mechanical detonator, known as a Hebelzünder 44  which used a percussion cap. Later versions fired the main charge using a device known as a Buck igniter.

The Buck igniter was a small can of thin, corrugated aluminium. This contained a glass ampoule of sulfuric acid, surrounded by flash powder that included powdered naphthalene. The resulting chemical reaction produced a flash that ignited the detonator of the main explosive charge.

In 1944 and 1945, 11 million mines were produced; at the end of World War II, 9.7 million were still in stock. Along with other companies, the  participated in the production.

Effect and legacy
Glass shrapnel was not easily detectable via X-rays, which rendered medical assistance to victims much harder than conventional mines. Glass also carried an increased infection risk; moreover, life-threatening injuries were more difficult to assess.

Mines of this type are still buried in the Eifel National Park on the grounds of the Vogelsang Military Training Area, a former "Nazi leadership" training center.

Demining areas with this type of mine is resource intensive, as the fields must be swept either by hand or with mine flails like the Keiler, not forgetting that the latter has a certain margin of error since it was developed with military-tactical deployments in mind (creating pathways through minefields).

In 2004, the Colombian Government claimed that "home-made" glass mines were employed by guerrillas in Colombia.

References

External links
 Description and images on LEXPEV
 Catalog of Enemy Ordnance, U.S. Office of Chief of Ordnance, 1945  
 Another short description on Castle Argghhh!!!

World War II infantry weapons of Germany
Anti-personnel mines
Land mines of Germany
Weapons and ammunition introduced in 1944